Arcanum (spelled a͡rcānˈum on the cover) was a 1996 album released by Acoustic Alchemy, their penultimate release on the GRP jazz label.

The production on this album differed from normal; the band recorded the disc live at Pinewood Film Studios, London, UK. They enlisted the help of the London Metropolitan Orchestra to provide backing.

The album contained twelve tracks, three of which were new ("Columbia", "Chance Meeting" and "Something She Said"), and the others re-recordings of tracks selected from the band's discography to this point.

Footage from some of the recording of this album appears on the GRP video release, "Best Kept Secret" (VHS 1998, DVD 2006).

Track listing

References

Acoustic Alchemy albums
1996 albums
GRP Records albums